Louis Sclavis (born 2 February 1953) is a French jazz musician. He performs on clarinet, bass clarinet, and soprano saxophone in a variety of contexts, including avant-garde jazz, free jazz, free improvisation and  contemporary classical.

Life and career
He was born in Lyon, France. Sclavis played with the Henri Texier Quartet.

He has won numerous awards, including: the PRIX DJANGO REINHARDT “best French jazz musician” (1988); First Prize in the Barcelona Biennale (1989); the British Jazz award at the Midem for “Best Foreign Artist” (1990/91); the DJANGO D’OR “Best French jazz record of the year” (1993); and the GRAND PRIX SACEM 2009.

He was one of the first to combine jazz with French folk music, working most prominently with the hurdy-gurdy player Valentin Clastrier.

Discography 
 Ad Augusta Per Argustia (Nato, 1981)
 Clarinettes (Label Bleu, 1985)
 Chine (Ida, 1987)
 Chamber Music (Ida, 1989)
 Ellington on the Air (Ida, 1991)
 Rouge (ECM, 1991)
 Trio de Clarinettes: Live (FMP, 1991)
 Acoustic Quartet (ECM, 1994)
 Carnet de Routes (Label Bleu, 1995)
 Ceux qui veillent la nuit (JMS, 1996)
 Danses et Autres Scenes (JMS, 1998)
 Les Violences de Rameau (ECM, 1996)
 Suite Africaine (Label Bleu, 1999)
 L'Affrontement des Prétendants (ECM, 1999)
 Dans la Nuit (ECM, 2000)
 Napoli's Walls (ECM, 2002)
 Bow River Falls (Koch, 2004)
 Roman, (2004);
 African Flashback (Label Bleu, 2005)
 L'Imparfait des Langues (ECM, 2007)
 Lost on the Way (ECM, 2009)
 Eldorado Trio (Clean Feed, 2010)
 Sources (ECM, 2012)
 Silk and Salt Melodies (ECM, 2014)
 Characters On A Wall (ECM, 2019)
 Les Cadances Du Monde (JMS-Cream, 2022)

Filmography 
 1999: Ça commence aujourd'hui by  Bertrand Tavernier (Sony Music France)
 2002: Un moment de bonheur by Antoine Santana
 2002: Dans la nuit by  Charles Vanel (ECM)
 2002: Vivre me tue by Jean-Pierre Sinapi
 2007: Après lui by Gaël Morel
 2009: Plus tard tu comprendras by Amos Gitaï
 2009: Portraits-autoportraits by Gilles Porte
 2011: Roses à crédit by Amos Gitaï

References

External links

FMP releases
 

1953 births
Living people
Post-bop clarinetists
Post-bop saxophonists
Chamber jazz clarinetists
Chamber jazz saxophonists
Bass clarinetists
French jazz saxophonists
Male saxophonists
Musicians from Lyon
French jazz clarinetists
French composers
Avant-garde jazz clarinetists
Avant-garde jazz saxophonists
21st-century saxophonists
21st-century clarinetists
21st-century French male musicians
French male jazz musicians
Brotherhood of Breath members
Clean Feed Records artists
Label Bleu artists
ECM Records artists
FMP/Free Music Production artists